Canton Fair Complex West station is a station of Haizhu Tram of the Guangzhou Metro. It started operations on 31 December 2014.

References

Railway stations in China opened in 2014
Guangzhou Metro stations in Haizhu District